The following is an alphabetical list of articles related to the Canadian province of British Columbia.

0-9
1700 Cascadia earthquake
1898 British Columbia general election
1900 British Columbia general election
1903 British Columbia general election
1907 British Columbia general election
1909 British Columbia general election
1912 British Columbia general election
1916 British Columbia general election
1920 British Columbia general election
1924 British Columbia general election
1928 British Columbia general election
1933 British Columbia general election
1937 British Columbia general election
1941 British Columbia general election
1945 British Columbia general election
1949 British Columbia general election
1952 British Columbia general election
1953 British Columbia general election
1954 British Empire and Commonwealth Games
1956 British Columbia general election
1960 British Columbia general election
1963 British Columbia general election
1966 British Columbia general election
1969 British Columbia general election
1972 British Columbia general election
1975 British Columbia general election
1979 British Columbia general election
1983 British Columbia general election
1986 British Columbia general election
1991 British Columbia general election
1996 British Columbia general election
2001 British Columbia general election
2005 British Columbia general election
2006 Central Pacific cyclone
2009 British Columbia general election
2010 Winter Olympics
2010 Winter Paralympics
2012 Valley First Crown of Curling
2013 British Columbia general election
2013 Kamloops Crown of Curling
2017 British Columbia general election
2017 Kamloops Crown of Curling
2020 British Columbia general election

A 
Agricultural Land Reserve
Air pollution in British Columbia
APEC Canada 1997
Alaska Boundary Dispute
Alberni-Clayoquot Regional District
Alberni Inlet
Alberni Valley
Alexandria First Nation
Anahim Lake
Anderson Lake (British Columbia)
Barbara Andrews (bishop)
Anglican Diocese of New Westminster
Annacis Island
Omer Arbel
Atlin, British Columbia
Janet Austin

B 
Baillie-Grohman Canal
Marilyn Baptiste
Barkerville
Dave Barrett
BC Bud
BC Council for Families
BC Ferries
BC Geographical Names
BC Hydro
BC Legislature Raids
BC Lions
BC Place
BC Rail
BC Sports Hall of Fame
Beacon Hill Park
Robert Beaven
Bill Bennett
W. A. C. Bennett
Big Bend Country
Andrew Bilesky
Boat Encampment
Bocci
Boundary Bay
William John Bowser
Brentwood Bay, British Columbia
Chartres Brew
Harlan Carey Brewster
Bridge River
Bridgeview, Surrey
British Columbia Aviation Museum
British Columbia Coast
British Columbia Conservative Party
British Columbia Court of Appeal
British Columbia dollar
British Columbia Ferry Corporation
British Columbia Forest Practices Board
British Columbia Highway 1
British Columbia Highway 5
British Columbia Highway 17A
British Columbia Highway 20
British Columbia Highway 93
British Columbia Highway 95
British Columbia Highway 99
British Columbia Hockey League
British Columbia Interior
British Columbia Liberal Party
British Columbia Parliament Buildings
British Columbia Social Credit Party
British Columbia Railway
British Columbia Resources Investment Corporation
British Columbia Summer Swimming Association
British Columbia Terms of Union
British Columbia Treaty Process
British Columbia Utilities Commission
British Columbia Unity Party
British Columbia Youth Parliament
Corryn Brown
Burnaby
Burns Lake
Burrard Inlet
Butchart Gardens

C 
Cache Creek, British Columbia
Iona Campagnolo
Kim Campbell
Gordon Campbell
Canada–United States border
Canadian Pacific Railway
Canal Flats
Canal Flats Provincial Park
Cannabis in British Columbia
Capilano River
Capital Regional District
Cariboo
Cariboo District
Cariboo Gold Rush
Cariboo Land District
Cariboo Mountains
Cariboo Plateau
Cariboo Road
Carrier-Chilcotin Tribal Council
Cascadia (bioregion)
Cascadia (independence movement)
Cascadia subduction zone
Cassiar, British Columbia
Cassiar Land District
Centerm
Central City (Surrey, British Columbia)
Central Saanich, British Columbia
Chemainus
Chemainus River
Mike Chernoff (curler)
Chief Hunter Jack
Chilcotin Country
Chilcotin District
Chilcotin language
Chilcotin River
Chilcotin War
Chilko River
Chimney Rock (Canada)
Chinatown, Victoria
Christ Church Cathedral (Victoria, British Columbia)
Christy Clark
Glen Clark
Clayoquot Sound
Clayoquot Sound Biosphere Reserve
Clayoquot Sound Central Region Board
Clear Range
Clearwater River (British Columbia)
Cloverdale, Surrey
Coast Mountains
Coast Salish
Coat of Arms of British Columbia
Coat of arms of Vancouver
Coat of arms of Victoria, British Columbia
College of New Caledonia
Colony of British Columbia (1866–1871)
Colony of Vancouver Island
Columbia District
Columbia Lake
Columbia Mountains
Columbia River
Colwood, British Columbia
Comox-Strathcona Regional District
Comox Valley Regional District
Conservation status of British Columbia salmonids
Continental Newspapers
Jim Cotter (curler)
Douglas Coupland
Courtenay, British Columbia
William George Cox
David Crawley (bishop)
Raymond Culos
Current Swell

D 
D'Arcy Island
Dakelh
Alexander Edmund Batson Davie
Theodore Davie
Dayglo Abortions
Amor De Cosmos
Adam de Pencier
Ralph Dean
Deas Island
John Deighton
Delta, British Columbia
Democratic Reform British Columbia
Grant Dezura
Diocese of British Columbia
Diocese of Caledonia
Diocese of Cariboo
Diocese of Kootenay
Discovery Islands
Ujjal Dosanjh
Doug flag
Douglas First Nation
James Douglas (governor)
Douglas Ranges
Douglas Road
Douglas Street
Downtown Vancouver
Frederick Du Vernet
James Dunsmuir
Robert Dunsmuir
Dutch Creek Hoodoos

E 
East Vancouver
Ecclesiastical Province of British Columbia and Yukon
Andrew Charles Elliott
English Bay, Vancouver
Esquimalt
Esquimalt (electoral district)
Esquimalt Harbour
Esquimalt-Metchosin
Esquimalt-Royal Roads
Executive Council of British Columbia
Expo 86
Expo Line (SkyTrain)

F 
Fairmont Hot Springs, British Columbia
False Creek
Financial District, Vancouver
Finlayson Channel
Flag of British Columbia
Flag of Richmond, British Columbia
Flag of Vancouver
Flag of Vancouver Island
Flag of Victoria, British Columbia
Fleetwood, Surrey
Flora Bank
Rick Folk
Forest Renewal BC
Fort Chilcotin
Fort St. James
Dean Fortin
Allan Fotheringham
Fountain, British Columbia
Francis Peninsula
Francis Point Provincial Park
Franco-Columbians
Fraser Canyon
Fraser Canyon Gold Rush
Fraser Lowland
Fraser River

G 
Gabriola Island
Galiano Island
Garibaldi Provincial Park
Gastown
Gateway station (SkyTrain)
Sean Geall
Geography of British Columbia
Georgia Depression
Brent Giles
Glacier Media
Golden Hinde (mountain)
Goldstream Provincial Park
Goldstream River (Vancouver Island)
Good Hope Lake
Government House, British Columbia
Government of British Columbia
Paul Gowsell
Granby River
Grand Forks, British Columbia
Granville, British Columbia
Greater Vancouver
Greater Victoria
Green Party of British Columbia
Green River (British Columbia)
Greenpeace
Bert Gretzinger
Gribbell Island
Judith Guichon
Guildford, British Columbia
Guildford Town Centre
Ryan Guldemond
Gulf Islands
Gulf Islands National Park Reserve
Gwendoline (sternwheeler)

H 
Hanceville, British Columbia
John Hannen
Rick Hansen
Hanukkah Eve Wind Storm of 2006
Mike Harcourt
John Hart (Canadian politician)
Hastings Mill
Lisa Helps
Highlands, British Columbia
History of British Columbia
Hollywood North
Homathko River
Hope, British Columbia
John Horgan
House dish
Bruce Hutchison

I 
Indigenous peoples of the Pacific Northwest Coast
In-SHUCK-ch Nation
Insular Mountains
Insurance Corporation of British Columbia
Interior Plateau

J 
Dean Joanisse
Boss Johnson
Rita Johnston
Jon and Roy

K 
Kakwa Provincial Park and Protected Area
Kal Tire Place
Kamloops
Kamloops Airport
Kamloops Crown of Curling
Kamloops Indian Residential School
Kamloops Lake
Karmutsen Formation
Kechika River
Kelowna
Kermode bear
Kettle River (Columbia River tributary)
cEvin Key
King George Boulevard
King George station
Linda Kirton
Klattasine
Patti Knezevic
Kootenay Land District
Kootenay River
Leonard Krog
Kwadacha Wilderness Provincial Park
Kwantlen Polytechnic University

L 
Ladner, British Columbia
Ladner Ferry
Ladysmith, British Columbia
Langford, British Columbia
Langley, British Columbia (city)
Langley, British Columbia (district municipality)
Kelley Law
Leamy Acoustic Art
Legislative Assembly of British Columbia
Liard Plain
Lieutenant-Governor of British Columbia
Gordon Light
Lighthouse Park
Lillooet
Lillooet Country
Lillooet Icecap
Lillooet Land District
Lillooet River
Lillooet Tribal Council
Lil'wat First Nation
Lions Gate Bridge
List of Lieutenant-Governors of British Columbia
List of British Columbia premiers
List of British Columbia provincial highways
List of British Columbia Regional Districts
List of British Columbia Universities
List of British Columbians
List of communities in British Columbia
List of mayors of Qualicum Beach, British Columbia
List of physiogeographic regions of British Columbia
List of power stations in British Columbia
List of television stations in British Columbia
List of waterfalls of British Columbia
Lord River (Canada)
Lower Mainland
Lower Stl'atl'imx Tribal Council
Daniel Loxton
Lulu Island
Lussier Hot Springs
Lussier River
Lyackson First Nation
Lytton, British Columbia

M 
Allison MacInnes
Mackenzie, British Columbia
John Duncan MacLean
Madeira Park
Marla Mallett
Marble Canyon (British Columbia)
Marble Range
Joseph Martin (Canadian politician)
Mathieson Channel
Greg McAulay
Richard McBride
John Foster McCreight
Allan McLean (outlaw)
Donald McLean (fur trader)
Lynne McNaughton
Medical Services Plan
Mess Creek Escarpment
Mess Lake
Metchosin
Metro Vancouver Regional District
Metropolis at Metrotown
Mica Creek
Bryan Miki
Dan Miller (Canadian politician)
Moev
Monarchy in British Columbia
Monashee Mountains
Monmouth Mountain
Richard Clement Moody
Greg Moore (racing driver)
Mother Mother
Mount Currie, British Columbia
Mount Edziza volcanic complex
George Matheson Murray
Margaret Lally "Ma" Murray
Anthony Musgrave
Musqueam Indian Band

N 
Nanaimo
Nanaimo City Council
Nanaimo Harbour ferry terminal
Nanaimo (provincial electoral district)
Naramata
Naut'sa mawt Tribal Council
Nemaiah Valley, British Columbia
Nettwerk
New Caledonia (Canada)
New Democratic Party of British Columbia
New Westminster
Newton, Surrey
Nicknames of Vancouver
Nicoamen River
Nicola (Okanagan leader)
North Saanich, British Columbia
North Shore Mountains
North Star (sternwheeler 1897)
North Thompson River
North Vancouver (district municipality)
November 2021 Pacific Northwest floods
N'Quatqua
N'Quatqua First Nation
Nuxalk Nation

O 
Oak Bay, British Columbia
Oak Bay (electoral district)
Ogden Point
Dave Ogilvie
Ogopogo
Nivek Ogre
Okanagan
Okanagan Country
Okanagan Lake
Okanagan Lake Bridge
John Oliver (British Columbia politician)
Adam Olsen
Order of British Columbia
Oregon boundary dispute
Oregon Country
Oregon Treaty
Osoyoos

P 
Pacific Scandal
Park Royal Shopping Centre
Parliament of British Columbia
Duff Pattullo
Pattullo Bridge
Pavilion, British Columbia
Pavilion Lake
Pavilion Mountain
Peace Arch
Peace River Block
Peachland
Peak 2 Peak Gondola
Pemberton, British Columbia
Pender Harbour, British Columbia
Penticton
Penticton Herald
Dailene Pewarchuk
Brent Pierce
Pig War (1859)
Steven Point
Point Grey
Charles Edward Pooley
Pooley Island
Port Alberni
Port of Vancouver
Port of Vancouver (1964–2008)
Potlatch
Prince George, British Columbia
Princess Royal Island
Edward Gawler Prior
John Privett
Prospect Point (British Columbia)
Provincial Health Services Authority
Pugets Sound Agricultural Company

Q 
qathet Regional District
Quadra Island
Quesnel, British Columbia
Quesnel Highland
Quesnel Lake
Quesnel River

R 
Rattlesnake Island (Okanagan Lake)
Reform Party of British Columbia
Regional district
Regional District of East Kootenay
Regional District of Nanaimo
Ryan Reynolds
Richmond, British Columbia
Roberts Bank
Roberts Bank Superport
John Robson (politician)
Rocky Mountain Trench
Rocky Mountains
Roderick Island
Royal British Columbia Museum
Royal City Curling Club
Royal Roads
Royal Roads University

S 
Saanich and the Islands
Saanich, British Columbia
Saanich (electoral district)
Saanich Inlet
Saanich—Gulf Islands
Saanich language
Saanich North and the Islands
Saanich Peninsula
Saanich people
Saanich South
Saanichton
Salish Sea
Salt Spring Island
Samahquam First Nation
Same-sex marriage in British Columbia
Pat Sanders
Randeep Sarai
Sasquatch
Saturna Island
Save-On-Foods
Save-On-Foods Memorial Centre
Kelly Scott
Scott Road station
Semiahmoo First Nation
Charles Augustus Semlin
Seton Lake First Nation
Seton Portage
Frederick Seymour
Shalalth
Sidney, British Columbia
Simon Fraser University
Skatin First Nations
Melissa M. Skelton
Julie Skinner
Skinny Puppy
Skookumchuck, British Columbia
SkyTrain (Vancouver)
William Smithe
Snuneymuxw First Nation
Socialist Party of British Columbia
South Surrey
South Westminster
Bernie Sparkes
Squamish Nation
Squamish people
Stanley Park
Starlight Stadium
Stʼatʼimc
Stone First Nation
Strait of Georgia
Strait of Juan de Fuca
Kennedy Stewart (Canadian politician)
Dorothy Stowe
Irving Stowe
Strathcona Provincial Park
Strathcona Regional District
Stikine Region
Stz'uminus First Nation
Sumas Prairie
Summerland, British Columbia
Surrey, British Columbia
Surrey Central station
Surrey Libraries
Surrey North
Surrey-Whalley
Susan Island

T 
Tacheeda, British Columbia
Taseko Lakes
Taseko River
Tchaikazan River
TED (conference)
Telegraph Creek
Territory of the People
The Daily Courier (Kelowna)
The Empress (hotel)
The Grapes of Wrath (band)
Thetis Lake
Thetis Lake Monster
Thompson River
Thuja plicata
Thunderbird Park (Victoria, British Columbia)
Times Colonist
Tl'etinqox-t'in Government Office
Tlingit
Tlingit language
Simon Fraser Tolmie
Toosey First Nation
Top of the World Provincial Park
TransLink (British Columbia)
Tsawwassen
Tŝideldel First Nation
Tsilhqotʼin
Tsilhqot'in Nation v British Columbia
Tsilhqot'in National Government
Tŝilhqox Biny
Ts'il?os Provincial Park
Tsleil-Waututh First Nation
John Herbert Turner

U 
Ulkatcho First Nation
University of British Columbia
University of Victoria
Bob Ursel

V 
Valdes Island
Vancouver
Vancouver 2010 (video game)
Vancouver Island
Vancouver Sun
Vancouver Whitecaps FC
Vancouverism
Bill Vander Zalm
Vanderhoof, British Columbia
Vernon, British Columbia
Victoria, British Columbia
Victoria Butterfly Gardens
Victoria Cool Aid Society
Victoria Salmon Kings
View Royal

W 
Alfred Waddington
George Anthony Walkem
Chris Walter (author)
Wanetta Lake
Sarah Wark
West End, Vancouver
West Kelowna
West Shore, British Columbia
West Vancouver
Western Canada
Westham Island
Whalley, Surrey
Georgina Wheatcroft
Whistler Blackcomb
Whistler, British Columbia
Whistler Mountain
Whiteswan Lake Provincial Park
William R. Bennett Bridge
Williams Creek (British Columbia)
Williams Lake, British Columbia
Willis Point, British Columbia
Willow River (British Columbia)
Willow River, British Columbia
Mike Wood (curler)

X 
Xeni Gwet'in
Xeni Gwet'in First Nation

Y 
Yale, British Columbia
Yunesit'in

Z

See also

Index of Canada-related articles

British Columbia